The Ruthwell Cross is a stone Anglo-Saxon cross probably dating from the 8th century, when the village of Ruthwell, now in Scotland, was part of the Anglo-Saxon Kingdom of Northumbria.

It is the most famous and elaborate Anglo-Saxon monumental sculpture, and possibly contains the oldest surviving text, predating any manuscripts containing Old English poetry.  It has been described by Nikolaus Pevsner thus; "The crosses of Bewcastle and Ruthwell ... are the greatest achievement of their date in the whole of Europe."

The cross was smashed by Presbyterian iconoclasts in 1642, and the pieces left in the churchyard until they were restored and re-erected in the manse garden in 1823 by Henry Duncan. In 1887 it was moved into its current location inside Ruthwell church, Dumfriesshire, Scotland, when the apse which holds it was specially built. It was designated a scheduled monument in 1921, but had this removed in 2018, due to it being in a controlled, safe environment and not needed scheduling.

Description

Anglo-Saxon crosses are closely related to the contemporary Irish high crosses, and both are part of the Insular art tradition. The Ruthwell cross features the largest figurative reliefs found on any surviving Anglo-Saxon cross—which are virtually the largest surviving Anglo-Saxon reliefs of any sort—and has inscriptions in both Latin and, unusually for a Christian monument, the runic alphabet, the latter containing lines similar to lines 39–64 of Dream of the Rood, an Old English poem, which were possibly added at a later date.

The two main sides of the cross (north and south) feature figurative relief carvings, now considerably worn, that depict Christ and several other figures; their subjects and interpretation have been much discussed by art historians, and the cross continues to be "one of the most extensive and most studied of all surviving visual programs of the early Middle Ages." It is clear to most scholars that the images and texts each form part of a sophisticated and unified programme, "almost an academician's monument," though a number of different schemes have been proposed, and some suggest the runic inscription may have been added later.

The largest panel on the cross (north side) shows either Christ treading on the beasts, a subject especially popular with the Anglo-Saxons, or its rare pacific variant Christ as Judge recognised by the beasts in the desert, as suggested by the unique Latin inscription surrounding the panel: "IHS XPS iudex aequitatis; bestiae et dracones cognoverunt in deserto salvatorem mundi" – "Jesus Christ: the judge of righteousness: the beasts and dragons recognised in the desert the saviour of the world." Whatever the subject,  it is clearly the same as the very similar relief that is the largest panel on the nearby Bewcastle Cross which, subject to dating, was probably created by the same artists. Below this is Saints Paul and Antony breaking bread in the desert, another rare scene identified by an inscription ("Sanctus Paulus et Antonius duo eremitae fregerunt panem in deserto"), then either a Flight into Egypt or perhaps a Return from Egypt, and at the bottom a scene too worn to decipher, which may have been a Nativity of Christ.

On the south side is Mary Magdalene drying the feet of Christ, which is bordered by the longest Latin inscription on the cross: "Attulit alabastrum unguenti et stans retro secus pedes eius lacrimis coepit rigare pedes eius et capillis capitas sui tergebat" – see Luke 7:37–38 and John 12:3. Below this is the Healing of the man born blind from John 9:1, inscribed: "Et praeteriens vidit hominem caecum a natibitate et sanavit eum ab infirmitate," the Annunciation ("Et ingressus angelus ad eam dixit ave gratia plena dominus tecum benedicta tu in mulieribus" – “And an angel came to her saying, “Hail, full of grace, the Lord is with you. Blessed are you amongst women.””-- Luke 1:28) and the Crucifixion, which on stylistic grounds is considered to have been added at a considerably later period.

These scenes are on the main, lower, section of the shaft, which was broken above the largest scenes, and possibly the two sections were not restored the right way round. Above the large scene on the north side is either John the Baptist holding a lamb, or possibly God the Father holding the Lamb of God, who opens a book as in Apocalypse 5:1–10. Above this (and another break) are two remaining figures of the Four Evangelists with their symbols that originally were on the four arms of the cross-head: St. Matthew on the lowest arm, and St. John the Evangelist on the top arm. The side arms and centre roundel of the cross are replacements, of purely speculative (and most improbable) design.

On the south side, Martha and Mary (with inscription) are followed by an archer, the subject of almost as much debate as the judging Christ, on the lowest arm of the Cross, and an eagle on the top arm.

Destruction and restoration
It escaped injury at the time of general destruction during the Reformation in the sixteenth century, but in 1640 the General Assembly of the Church of Scotland ordered the "many idolatrous monuments erected and made for religious worship" to be "taken down, demolished, and destroyed." It was not until two years later, however, that the cross was taken down when an Act was passed "anent the Idolatrous Monuments in Ruthwell." The usual account is that the cross was taken down in the church or churchyard soon after the 1642 order and broken up. One piece, it appears, was used as a bench to sit upon. The pieces were later removed from the church and left out in the churchyard. By 1823, Henry Duncan had collected all the pieces he could find, and put them together, commissioning a new crossbeam (the original was lost), and having gaps filled in with small pieces of stone. He then erected it in the manse garden.

Duncan's restoration is questionable. He was convinced that he was reconstructing a "Popish" (Roman Catholic) monument, and based his work on "drawings of similar Popish relics." Duncan dismissed the rare early medieval motif of Paul and Anthony breaking bread in the desert as probably "founded on some Popish tradition."

Cross or pillar
It has been suggested that the work was not in fact originally a cross. In a 2008 journal article, Patrick W. Conner wrote that he would not call the structure a cross: "Fred Orton has argued persuasively that the lower stone on which the runic poem is found may, indeed, never have belonged to a standing cross, or if it did, that cannot be asserted with confidence now. For that reason, I shall refer throughout to the Ruthwell Monument in preference to the Ruthwell Cross."

In his 1998 essay, “Rethinking the Ruthwell Monument: Fragments and Critique; Tradition and History; Tongues and Sockets,” scholar Fred Orton discusses a note Reginald Bainbrigg wrote to William Camden in 1600 for possible publication in any new edition of his 1586 Britannia: “Bainbrigg saw a ‘column’ which he referred to as a ‘cross,’” Orton said of the note. Orton is also convinced the piece is made of two different types of stone: “... it seems to make more sense to see the Ruthwell monument as originally a column ... amended with the addition of a Crucifixion scene, and then ... further amended with the addition of a cross made of a different kind of stone."

Runic inscription

At each side of the vine-tracery runic inscriptions are carved. The runes were first described around 1600, and Reginald Bainbrigg of Appleby recorded the inscription for the Britannia of William Camden. Around 1832, the runes were recognized as different from the Scandinavian futhark (categorized as Anglo-Saxon runes) by Thorleif Repp, by reference to the Exeter Book. 
His rendition referred to a place called the vale of Ashlafr, compensation for injury, a font and a monastery of Therfuse.
John Mitchell Kemble in 1840 advanced a reading referring to Mary Magdalene.

The better known Dream of the Rood interpretation is due to a revised reading of Kemble's in an 1842 article. 
The inscription along the top and left side is read as:
   ᛣᚱᛁᛋᛏ ᚹᚫᛋ ᚩᚾ ᚱᚩᛞᛁ ᚻᚹᛖᚦᚱᚨ / ᚦᛖᚱ ᚠᚢᛋᚨ ᚠᛠᚱᚱᚪᚾ ᛣᚹᚩᛗᚢ / ᚨᚦᚦᛁᛚᚨ ᛏᛁᛚ ᚪᚾᚢᛗ / ᛁᚳ ᚦᚨᛏ ᚪᛚ ᛒᛁᚻ
    Krist wæs on rodi. Hweþræ / þer fusæ fearran kwomu / æþþilæ til anum / ic þæt al bih[eald].
    "Christ was on the cross.  And there hastening from far came they to the noble prince. I beheld all that."

Kemble's revised reading is based on the poem of the Vercelli Book, to the extent that missing words in each are supplied from the other.  Kemble himself notes how the inscription may be "corrected" with the help of the Vercelli Book.
The inscription on the left side is read:
Mith strelum giwundad alegdun hiæ hinæ limwoerignæ gistoddun him
 "With missiles wounded, they laid him down limb-weary, they stood by him"
The manuscript text reads:
Crīst wæs on rōde. Hwæðere þǣr fūse⁠feorran cwōman tō þām Æðelinge; ic þæt eall behēold. [...] mid strǣlum forwundod. Ālēdon hīe ðǣr limwērigne,⁠ gestōdon him æt his līces hēafdum

The interpretation is disputed and may be a conjecture inserted by Kemble himself: O'Neill (2005) notes Kemble's "almost pathological dislike of Scandinavian interference in what he sees as the English domain."

Many believe that the runes, as opposed to the Latin inscriptions, were added later, possibly as late as the 10th century. Conner agrees with Paul Meyvaert's conclusion that the runic poem dates from after the period in which the monument was created.  He says Meyvaert has “satisfactorily explained” that the layout of the runes suggests “that the stone was already standing when the decision to add the runic poem was made.”   The runic inscription on the monument is not a “formulaic” memorial text of the kind usually carved in Old English on stone. Rather, Conner sees the content of the runic addition to the monument as related to prayers used in the adoration of the cross first composed in the tenth century. He therefore concludes that the poem was developed in the 10th century – well after the creation of the monument.

Recent scholarship
The "Visionary Cross project", led by Catherine Karkov, Daniel Paul O'Donnell, and Roberto Rosselli Del Turco, studies crosses such as the Ruthwell Cross, the Bewcastle Cross, and the Brussels Cross, and in 2012 performed 3D-scans at Ruthwell.

Gallery

See also
Nith Bridge cross
Easby Cross in the Victoria and Albert Museum, with Bewcastle and Ruthwell the best preserved Northumbrian cross
 Scheduled monuments in Dumfries and Galloway

Notes

References
 
Farr, Carol A., Woman as sign in Early Anglo-Saxon Monasticism, in The Insular Tradition, SUNY series in medieval studies, Eds: Catherine E. Karkov, Michael Ryan, Robert T. Farrell, SUNY Press, 1997, .
Haney, Kristine Edmonson, The Christ and the Beasts Panel on the Ruthwell Cross, in Anglo-Saxon England, vol 14, Editors Peter Clemoes, Simon Keynes, Michael Lapidge, Cambridge University Press, 2008, .
Herren, Michael W., and Brown, Shirley Ann, Christ in Celtic Christianity: Britain and Ireland from the Fifth to the Tenth Century, Volume 20 of Studies in Celtic history, Boydell Press, 2002, .
Hilmo, Maidie. Medieval Images, Icons, and Illustrated English Literary Texts: From Ruthwell Cross to the Ellesmere Chaucer, Ashgate Publishing, Ltd., 2004, .
Orton, Fred. "Rethinking the Ruthwell Monument: Fragments and critique; tradition and history; tongues and sockets." Art History. 21.1 (1998): 65–106.
 Ó Carragáin, Éamonn, Christian Inculturation in Eighth-Century Northumbria: The Bewcastle and Ruthwell Crosses, Colloquium Magazine, Vol 4, Autumn 2007, Yale Institute of Sacred Music.
 Ó Carragáin, Éamonn, Ritual and the Rood: Liturgical Images and the Old English Poems of the Dream of the Rood Tradition, University of Toronto Press Incorporated, 2005.
 Pevsner, Nikolaus, The buildings of Cumberland and Westmorland (the Buildings of England series) .
 Raw, Barbara (June 1994) Ruthwell Cross: Description. University of Oxford.
 Schapiro, Meyer, Selected Papers, volume 3, Late Antique, Early Christian and Mediaeval Art, 1980, Chatto & Windus, London,  (includes The Religious Meaning of the Ruthwell Cross (1944), etc.).
Wilson, David M.; Anglo-Saxon Art: From The Seventh Century To The Norman Conquest, Thames and Hudson (US edn. Overlook Press), 1984.

Further reading
Bammesberger, Alfred (1994). "Two archaic forms in the Ruthwell cross inscription," English Studies Vol. 75, Issue 2, pp. 97–103.
Cassidy, Brendan (ed.), The Ruthwell Cross, Princeton University Press (1992).
Conner, Patrick W. (2008). "The Ruthwell Monument Runic Poem in a Tenth-Century Context." Review of English Studies 59(238): 25–51, JSTOR
Kelly, Richard J. (ed.), Stone, Skin and Silver, Litho Press / Sheed & Ward (1999). 
Hawkes, Jane & Mills, Susan (eds.), Northumbria's Golden Age, Sutton Publishing Ltd (1999).
Royal Commission on Ancient and Historical Monuments of Scotland, County of Dumfries, (1920).
Saxl, Fritz, "The Ruthwell Cross," Journal of the Warburg and Courtauld Institutes, Vol. 6, (1943), pp. 1–19, The Warburg Institute, JSTOR
Swanton, Michael James, The Dream of the Rood, Old and Middle English Texts Series, 1970, Manchester University Press, google books

External links
Ruthwell Church Official Website
Ruthwell Cross at Canmore, part of Historic Environment Scotland
The People & Language of Early Scotland at bbc.co.uk, with link to video of the cross

Anglo-Saxon art
Runic inscriptions
8th-century inscriptions
Monumental crosses in Scotland
Anglo-Saxon runes
High crosses in Scotland
Christian iconography
Historic Scotland properties in Dumfries and Galloway
Sculptures of the Annunciation
Flight into Egypt in art
Sculptures depicting the Crucifixion of Jesus